San Antonio del Tequendama is a municipality and town of Colombia in the Tequendama Province part of the department of Cundinamarca. The municipality is located along the Serranía de Subía in the Tena Valley and borders Tena and Bojacá in the north, Bojacá and Soacha in the east, La Mesa and El Colegio in the west and in the south Soacha and Granada.

Etymology 
The name Tequendama means in the Muysccubun, the language of the Muisca: "he who precipitated downward".

History 
This municipality was formed on the site of Cubsió, a place of reunion of the Muisca originally from Bojacá and Serrezuela. Cubsió was already populated by indigenous peoples from the Herrera Period with the oldest evidence dated at 1865 years BP (2nd century AD) of a site a few meters from the current course of the Bogotá River.

Around 1470 the terrains of San Antonio de Tequendama were ruled by the cacique of Fusagasugá, who fought with the Panche against Saguamanchica in the Battle of Pasca.

In 1539, conquistador Gonzalo Jiménez de Quesada organised an expedition down the Bogotá River where he sent his soldier Juan de Céspedes.

The modern town was founded by Críspulo Corredor in 1857. This municipality has changed names multiples times, San Antonio, San Antonio de Tena, and its actual name San Antonio del Tequendama.

Tourism 
The Chicaque Natural Park is an ecotouristic area within San Antonio del Tequendama.

Panorama

References

External links 
  Laughing rock art on Rupestreweb

Municipalities of Cundinamarca Department
Populated places established in 1857
1857 establishments in the Republic of New Granada
Muisca Confederation
Tequendama